Taillefer, Op. 52, TrV 207, is a cantata for choir and orchestra composed by Richard Strauss in 1903. The text is a rendering of the medieval tale Taillefer by the German poet Ludwig Uhland (1787–1862).  The piece was written to celebrate the centenary of Heidelberg University and was premiered on the same day that Strauss received his honorary doctorate from the university, on 26 October 1903 in the newly built Heidelberg Town Hall with Strauss conducting. It is written for a mixed chorus with three soloists, tenor (Taillefer), baritone (Duke William of Normandy), and soprano (the Duke's daughter and admirer of Taillefer), with a large orchestra.  The work was performed at the last night of The Proms in 2014.

Composition history

Taillefer is the hero of a romantic medieval tale set in the court of Duke William of Normandy (William the Conqueror) around the time of the invasion of England and the Battle of Hastings in 1066. Strauss used the version in a poem by Ludwig Uhland written in 1816. He had previously used several of Uhlands poems for songs, including "Des Dichters Abendgang" written in 1900. Professor Philip Wolfrum, music director and choir master at Heidelberg University commissioned the work, to be premiered in the new Town Hall in Heidelberg, coinciding with the award of an honorary doctorate for Strauss and with the centenary of the reestablishment of the university as a state-owned institution.  In fact, Strauss had been working on early drafts of the piece in the summer of 1902, prior to the commission (Strauss first mentions it in his notebook on 20 April, whilst in Berlin). In May he spent a short holiday in England, including a visit to the beach at Ventnor on the Isle of Wight, which further inspired him. However, Strauss realized that a large scale choral work like this would be a perfect piece for the commission and event. Most of the work was done over the period July–November 1902. The honorary doctorate was confirmed in June 1903 (while Strauss was again visiting London), and the award and premiere arranged for 26 October 1903.

According to Norman Del Mar: Uhland was always a most stirring writer and many of his poems have over the years taken on the popularity of folk songs. This particular ballad describes in heroic terms the Norman conquest and the courageous part played in it by Taillefer, Duke William’s favourite minstrel. Strauss thoroughly enjoyed making the most of the merry text. There are beautiful and exciting solos for baritone, tenor and soprano representing respectively Duke William, Taillefer and the Duke's sister. The chorus acts as narrator and commentator whilst the orchestra comes into its own with a graphic description of the battle of Hastings in a splendid interlude which even outdoes the battle scene in Ein Heldenleben. The whole score is carried through impetuously with a most infectious spirit, verging at times on the hilarious.  

Strauss described the piece as "written in the grandest music festival style", and the premiere was noteworthy for innovative features to show off the new concert hall: the lights were lowered, the orchestra performed from a pit, and the large brass section was shifted to the back of the orchestra. Some were critical of the performance: critic and poet Otto Julius Bierbaum quipped that it was "a huge orchestral sauce" ("Eine große Orchestersauce"). Others were more enthusiastic: in 1906 Gustav Mahler saw the work performed at the Concertgebouw, conducted by Willem Mengelberg and wrote to Strauss "I have just heard a splendid performance in Amsterdam of your Taillefer, of which I am especially fond among your works".

Lyrics

Forces

In addition to the three soloists (baritone, tenor and soprano) there is a mixed chorus split into eight parts, each of the four voices split into two.  The orchestra consists of:
 Four flutes, two piccolos, four oboes, two English horns,  six clarinets, two bass clarinets, Four bassoons, one double bassoon.
 Eight french horns, six trumpets, four trombones, two tubas
 Timpani and percussion.
 Strings: Twenty first and eighteen second violins, sixteen violas, fourteen cellos, twelve basses

However, while large, the orchestral resources were only slightly larger than those Mahler was to use in his 8th Symphony of 1910 and less than Arnold Schoenberg in his Gurre-Lieder of 1911.

References
Notes

Sources
 Del Mar, Norman, Richard Strauss. A Critical Commentary on his Life and Works, Volume 2, London: Faber and Faber (2009)[1969] (second edition), .
 Lodata, Suzanne, The Challenge of the Choral Works, chapter 11 in Mark-Daniel Schmid, Richard Strauss Companion, Praeger Publishers, Westfield CT, (2003), .
 Trenner, Franz (2003) Richard Strauss Chronik, Verlag Dr Richard Strauss Gmbh, Wien, .

Cantatas
1903 compositions
Compositions by Richard Strauss
Heidelberg University
Compositions in D major
Adaptations of works by Ludwig Uhland